Burton is an unincorporated community in Howard County, in the U.S. state of Missouri.

History
A post office called Burton was established in 1873, and remained in operation until 1935. The community has the name of Prior Burton, the original owner of the site.

References

Unincorporated communities in Howard County, Missouri
Unincorporated communities in Missouri